Kessler Donovan Edwards (born August 9, 2000) is an American professional basketball player for the Sacramento Kings of the National Basketball Association (NBA). He played college basketball for the Pepperdine Waves.

High school career
Edwards played basketball for Etiwanda High School in Rancho Cucamonga, California. As a junior, he averaged 17 points and nine rebounds per game, earning First Team All-Baseline League honors. Edwards averaged 21.3 points and 7.3 rebounds per game as a senior and was named Baseline League MVP. He competed for Prodigy Elite on the Amateur Athletic Union circuit. A consensus three-star recruit, he committed to playing college basketball for Pepperdine.

College career
As a freshman at Pepperdine, Edwards averaged 10 points and 5.6 rebounds per game. He was a WCC All-Freshman Team selection. As a sophomore, Edwards averaged 13.8 points and a team-leading 7.5 rebounds per game. He was named to the Second Team All-WCC. On January 21, 2021, he recorded a career-high 37 points and 11 rebounds in an 85–68 win over Pacific. He led Pepperdine to the College Basketball Invitational title and was named MVP. As a junior, Edwards averaged 17.2 points and 6.8 rebounds per game, earning First Team All-WCC recognition. On April 23, 2021, he declared for the 2021 NBA draft while maintaining his college eligibility. He later signed with BDA and WME Sports, forgoing his remaining eligibility.

Professional career

Brooklyn Nets (2021–2023)
Edwards was selected in the second round of the 2021 NBA draft with the 44th pick by the Brooklyn Nets, and was later included in the roster of the Nets for the 2021 NBA Summer League. On August 16, he signed a two-way contract with the Nets. Under the terms of the deal, he split time between Brooklyn and their NBA G League affiliate, the Long Island Nets. On April 10, 2022, Edwards's deal was promoted to a standard contract.

On July 6, 2022, Edwards re-signed with the Nets to a reported two-year contract.

Sacramento Kings (2023–present)
On February 8, 2023, Edwards and cash considerations were traded to the Sacramento Kings in exchange for the draft rights to David Michineau.

Career statistics

NBA

Regular season

|-
| style="text-align:left;"|
| style="text-align:left;"|Brooklyn
| 48 || 23 || 20.6 || .412 || .353 || .842 || 3.6 || .6 || .6 || .5 || 5.9
|-
| style="text-align:left;"|
| style="text-align:left;"|Brooklyn
| 14 || 1 || 5.6 || .250 || .167 || .500 || 1.0 || .1 || .2 || .1 || 1.1
|- class="sortbottom"
| style="text-align:center;" colspan="2"|Career
| 62 || 24 || 17.2 || .399 || .338 || .810 || 3.0 || .5 || .5 || .4 || 4.8

Playoffs

|-
| style="text-align:left;"|2022
| style="text-align:left;"|Brooklyn
| 2 || 0 || 3.5 || — || — || — || .0 || .5 || .5 || .0 || .0
|- class="sortbottom"
| style="text-align:center;" colspan="2"|Career
| 2 || 0 || 3.5 || — || — || — || .0 || .5 || .5 || .0 || .0

College

|-
| style="text-align:left;"| 2018–19
| style="text-align:left;"| Pepperdine
| 34 || 27 || 28.8 || .438 || .370 || .694 || 5.4 || 1.0 || 1.1 || 1.0 || 9.8
|-
| style="text-align:left;"| 2019–20
| style="text-align:left;"| Pepperdine
| 31 || 31 || 32.7 || .471 || .437 || .761 || 7.4 || 1.5 || .9 || 1.8 || 13.6
|-
| style="text-align:left;"| 2020–21
| style="text-align:left;"| Pepperdine
| 27 || 26 || 33.9 || .491 || .378 || .876 || 6.8 || 1.2 || 1.0 || 1.2 || 17.2
|- class="sortbottom"
| style="text-align:center;" colspan="2"| Career
| 92 || 84 || 31.6 || .469 || .395 || .789 || 6.5 || 1.2 || 1.0 || 1.3 || 13.3

Personal life
Edwards's older brother, Kameron, played college basketball for Pepperdine before embarking on a professional career.

References

External links
Pepperdine Waves bio
USA Basketball bio

2000 births
Living people
American men's basketball players
Basketball players from California
Brooklyn Nets draft picks
Brooklyn Nets players
Long Island Nets players
Pepperdine Waves men's basketball players
Small forwards
Sportspeople from Glendale, California